North West Warriors was formed in 2013 and became a List A team in 2017. They played their inaugural List A match in the 2017 Inter-Provincial Cup against Leinster Lightning. In total, 31 players have appeared in List A cricket for North West Warriors.

William Porterfield is North West Warriors leading run-scorer in List A cricket, aggregating 466 runs. Porterfield is also the only North West Warriors player score a century in the format, with his score of 110 not out scored in 2018 against Northern Knights. For players to have made five or more appearances, Niall O'Brien has the teams best batting average: 69.50. Among the bowlers, Craig Young has taken more wickets than with 18. Andrew Britton has the best bowling figures in an innings: he claimed five wickets against Leinster Lightning in a 2018 match, while conceding 23 runs.

Players are initially listed in order of appearance; where players made their debut in the same match, they are initially listed by batting order.

Key

List of List A cricketers

See also
List of North West Warriors first-class players
List of North West Warriors Twenty20 players
List of Irish first-class cricketers

References

North West Warriors
Cricketers, List A